The 1876 United States presidential election in Alabama took place on November 7, 1876, as part of the 1876 presidential election. Alabama voters chose ten representatives, or electors, to the Electoral College, who voted for president and vice president.

Alabama was won by Samuel J. Tilden, the former governor of New York (D–New York), running with Thomas A. Hendricks, the governor of Indiana and future vice president, with 59.98% of the popular vote, against Rutherford B. Hayes, the governor of Ohio (R-Ohio), running with Representative William A. Wheeler, with 40.02% of the vote.

Results

See also 
 United States presidential elections in Alabama

References 

Alabama
1876
1876 Alabama elections